Barcelona Sants is the main railway station in Barcelona, owned by Adif, the railway infrastructure agency of Spain. It has become the most important transport hub of the city - being the centre of Rodalies de Catalunya including Barcelona suburban railway services and regional services, as well as the main inter-city station for national and international destinations. The station is named after Sants, the neighbourhood of Barcelona in which it is located. New parts of the station have recently been remodeled to accommodate the Spanish high-speed train AVE in the city, which started serving the city on 20 February 2008. There is also an adjacent international bus station bearing the same name, and a link to the Sants Estació metro station that serves the railway station.

History and architectural design

The modern Sants station was built in the 1970s as part of construction of the second east–west regional line running under the centre of Barcelona. The first east–west railway to Estació de França terminus, more to the north, was covered up and is now also in use as a railtunnel for the regional and long-distance trains. Over the last 30 years, Estació de Sants has since eclipsed the earlier França terminus (Barcelona Estació de França), from the 1920s, as Barcelona's main railway station.

The station was built in a modern airport style, with all of its many platforms sited underground. A hotel (Hotel Barceló Sants) occupies most of the upper floors of the station's main building.

Location

The station is in the Sants-Montjuïc district of Barcelona, a little way to the west of the city centre, and is easily accessible via metro (see section below) or bus from anywhere in the city. Sited at the end of Avinguda Roma between two squares, Plaça dels Països Catalans and Plaça Joan Peiró, it has two entrances, one in each.

Services

Long distance
Madrid is two and a half hours away on the AVE Madrid–Barcelona high-speed rail line, after the link between Camp de Tarragona and Barcelona opened in 2008. Extension of the high-speed network east into France connecting with the TGV network was completed in January 2013 upon completion of the Perpignan–Barcelona high-speed rail line and a direct TGV service started in December 2013. The high speed service uses platforms 1 to 6, which have now been converted to the European standard gauge for use by the AVE services, unlike the remaining 8 for other RENFE services using the wider Spanish gauge tracks. A second major railway station in Barcelona, Estació de la Sagrera, currently under construction, is expected to join it in order to provide a wider access to high-speed and long-distance trains to the north of the city.

Regional and commuter rail

Barcelona Metro

References

External links

 Barcelona Sants listing at Adif website
 Barcelona Sants listing at Rodalies de Catalunya website
 Information and photos of the station at Trenscat.com 

Madrid–Barcelona high-speed rail line
Railway stations in Barcelona
Railway stations in Spain opened in 1975
Rodalies de Catalunya stations
Transport in Sants-Montjuïc
Railway stations located underground in Spain
Transit centers in Spain